Dhubyan or Banu Dhubyan are an Arabian tribe of Ghatafan branch,
one of the Adnani branches. Banu Dhubyan inhabited the Hijaz region and were mostly Christian.

Influential people of Dhubyan
Al-Nabigha

References

Dhubyan